A Dream of Kings may refer to:

 A Dream of Kings (film), a 1969 drama film directed by Daniel Mann
 A Dream of Kings (novel), a 1955 novel by American author Davis Grubb